This is a list of notable current and former faculty members, alumni, and non-graduating attendees of Indiana University Bloomington in Bloomington, Indiana.

Presidents of Indiana University

Academics

R.J.Q. Adams, B.S., 1965, professor of British history at Texas A&M University
Elijah Anderson, Sterling Professor of Sociology and of African American Studies at Yale University
Richard T. Antoun, professor emeritus of anthropology at Binghamton University
Jason Beckfield (PhD), Professor of Sociology at Harvard University
Metin Boşnak (BA in Comparative Literature, 1990), Turkish linguist and academic
Joseph C. Burke, former President of State University of New York at Plattsburgh, former Acting Chancellor of the State University of New York
Margaret K. Butler, mathematician specializing in computer software
Shiladitya DasSarma, molecular biologist and professor at University of Maryland School of Medicine
Lewis C. Dowdy, Ed.D., 1965, Sixth President & First Chancellor of North Carolina Agricultural and Technical State University
Keith Fitzgerald, political scientist
William Dudley Geer, first Dean of the School of Business at Samford University
William Germano, Ph.D., dean of the faculty of humanities at Cooper Union
Michael Harris,  (Hebrew : מייקל הריס), is an Israeli-American public policy scholar and university administrator
Israel Nathan Herstein, Ph.D., 1948, mathematician and professor at University of Chicago
Melvin N. Johnson, MBA 1979, DBA 1983, economist; president of Tennessee State University (2005–2011)
Joann Kealiinohomoku (Ph.D., 1976), anthropologist and dance researcher
Jeanne Knoerle, former president of Saint Mary-of-the-Woods College and program director of the Lilly Endowment
Paul Musgrave, professor of government and an expert in American foreign policy matters
William B. Pickett, historian and professor emeritus at Rose-Hulman Institute of Technology, Terre Haute, Indiana 
Sarah M. Pike, Ph.D., 1998, author and professor of comparative religion at California State University, Chico 
Robert N. Proctor, B.S., 1976, Professor of History of Science at Harvard
 Billy Rhoades, (1928-2021), mathematician and professor at IU
Elliot Sperling, Tibet scholar
Mark von Hagen (M.A., Slavic Languages and Literatures), director, School of Historical, Philosophical and Religious Studies, Arizona State University
Aldred Scott Warthin, pathologist, "father of cancer genetics"

Arts and humanities

Tony Aiello, broadcast journalist
Ismail al-Faruqi, philosopher and epistemologist
David Anspaugh, movie director, Hoosiers and Rudy
Howard Ashman, playwright and lyricist
Elliott Baker, author, screenwriter, Emmy Award winner
Radley Balko, journalist and writer
Jonathan Banks, actor, "Mike Ehrmantraut" of Breaking Bad and Better Call Saul
Mike Barz, broadcast journalist
Lyndall Bass, artist, shield cent designer
Betty Jane Belanus (Ph.D, Folklore), employee of and curator of several Smithsonian Folklife Festival programs
Daniel Bourne, poet
Jan Harold Brunvand, American folklorist, one of the best-known researchers and anthologists of urban legends; earned PhD in folklore
Joe Buck, sportscaster, multiple Emmy Award winner
Meg Cabot, author The Princess Diaries
E. Jean Carroll, journalist and advice columnist
Siobhan Carroll, professor, scholar and writer
David Chalmers, leading philosopher in the area of philosophy of mind
Sarah Clarke, actress
Tan Kheng Hua, actress
Suzanne Collins, television writer, novelist known for The Hunger Games
Robert Coover, author
J. Lee, actor Lt. Cmdr. John LaMarr The Orville The Lion King (2019 film)
Laverne Cox, actress and television producer
E. Wayne Craven, art historian
John Crowley, science fiction author, author of The Deep and Little, Big
Matthew Daddario, actor, "Alec Lightwood" of Shadowhunters
Tim Downs, author and comic artist for Downstown
Theodore Dreiser, author (dropped out)
Michel du Cille, photographer, two-time Pulitzer Prize winner
Dick Enberg, sportscaster, 13-time Emmy Award winner
Judith Lynn Ferguson, cookbook author
Scott Ferrall, sports talk radio host
John M. Ford, poet and science fiction author
Sherron Francis, artist
Tom French, Pulitzer Prize–winning journalist, St. Petersburg Times
David C. Giuntoli, actor
Jennifer Grotz, award-winning poet
Aishah Hasnie, broadcast journalist
Joseph Hayes, playwright, novelist
Hubert Crouse Heffner, theater director, teacher
Don Herold, author, humorist and illustrator
Ben Higgins, former lead of The Bachelor franchise
Nancy Hiller, cabinetmaker, educator, and author 
Lissa Hunter, artist
Edward D. Ives, folklorist
Patricia Kalember, actress
Andreas Katsulas, actor
Debra A. Kemp, author of Arthurian literature, such as The Firebrand
Charles Kimbrough, actor
Kevin Kline, Academy Award-winning actor
Michael Koryta, novelist
Mark Lavie, journalist
Ross Lockridge Jr., author of Raintree County
Bienvenido Lumbera, poet, critic, playwright, Ramon Magsaysay Award winner and National Artist of the Philippines
Lee Majors, actor, The Six Million Dollar Man
Alfred McAdams, painter
Judith McCulloh (Ph.D, Folklore) folklorist, ethnomusicologist, and university press editor
David McLane, creator, promoter and producer of Gorgeous Ladies of Wrestling
Don Mellett, 1914, journalist, newspaper editor, Pulitzer Prize winner
Gene Miller, journalist, editor, two-time Pulitzer Prize winner
Arian Moayed, Tony-nominated actor, co-founder of Waterwell and writer/director
Ryan Murphy, Golden Globe-winning television producer (Nip/Tuck); best known for American Horror Story
Dave Niehaus, broadcaster, Seattle Mariners
Komelia Hongja Okim, sculptor
Nicole Parker, actress
Jane Pauley, television personality and journalist
Angelo Pizzo, screenwriter, producer, director
Ernie Pyle, journalist, Pulitzer Prize winner in 1944
Catt Sadler, television personality on E! Entertainment Television
Scott Schuman, photographer and blogger
Alexander Shimkin, Vietnam war correspondent
Will Shortz, puzzle maker (enigmatologist)
Ranveer Singh, Indian actor
Tavis Smiley, National Public Radio and Public Television host
Gary Snyder, poet and environmental activist, Pulitzer Prize winner (did not graduate)
Lucy A. Snyder, author
Brian Stack, actor, Late Night with Conan O'Brien
Sage Steele, ESPN sports anchor
Jeri Taylor, screenwriter and television producer (Star Trek)
Nancy Weaver Teichert, Pulitzer Prize-winning reporter
Michael Uslan, film producer (Batman)
Herb Vigran, actor
Aaron Waltke, Emmy-winning screenwriter and executive producer (Star Trek, Tales of Arcadia)
Clark Wissler, anthropology pioneer

Business

Klaus Agthe, former Chairman and CEO of ASEA Brown Boveri
John Bitove, Chairman and CEO of XM Canada, Priszm and Scott's REIT; founder of Toronto Raptors(NBA)
John Chambers, president and CEO of Cisco Systems
Bob Chapek, CEO of The Walt Disney Company
Gayle Cook, co-founder of the Cook Group
Mark Cuban, technology entrepreneur; Dallas Mavericks owner; co-founder of Broadcast.com with Todd Wagner in 1995
William S. Dalton, current CEO of the H. Lee Moffitt Cancer Center and Research Institute
Lance de Masi, President of the American University in Dubai
Donald Fehr, managing director, Major League Baseball Players Association
Jeff M. Fettig, chairman and CEO of the Whirlpool Corporation
Jared Fogle, former spokesman for Subway and convicted sex offender
E. W. Kelley, former chairman of Steak 'n Shake
Donald Knauss, former CEO of Clorox Company and COO of The Coca-Cola Company in North America
Harold Arthur Poling, retired chairman and CEO of Ford Motor Company
Frank Popoff, retired Chairman and CEO of Dow Chemical Company
Conrad Prebys, property developer based in San Diego
Patty Stonesifer, former CEO, Bill and Melinda Gates Foundation; Chairwoman of Smithsonian Institution
Todd Wagner, CEO of 2929 Entertainment; founder of Todd Wagner Foundation; co-founder of Broadcast.com with Mark Cuban in 1995
Jimmy Wales, former CEO of Bomis, co-founder of Wikipedia, president of the Wikimedia Foundation (did not graduate)
Peter Wong, CEO of The Hongkong and Shanghai Banking Corporation (HSBC), Asia-Pacific

Law, politics, and government

Heads of state and government

Supreme Court justices

U.S. Senators

U.S. Representatives

Governors, other state officials and mayors

Cabinet members, chairpersons/administrators and advisers

Diplomats

Judges and attorneys

Other

Music

Jamey Aebersold, jazz educator
Kenny Aronoff, drummer
Emilie Autumn, gothic violinist and singer
David Baker, jazz composer
Klara Barlow, operatic soprano
Jamie Barton, operatic mezzo-soprano
Joshua Bell, Grammy Award-winning concert violinist
Noah Bendix-Balgley, violinist, concertmaster of Pittsburgh Symphony Orchestra, 1st concertmaster of Berlin Philharmonic
Jonathan Biss, pianist, professor at Curtis Institute of Music
Chris Botti, Grammy Award-winning jazz trumpeter
Cary Boyce, composer
Michael Brecker, jazz saxophonist
Angela Brown, soprano
Lawrence Brownlee, operatic tenor
Hoagy Carmichael, songwriter and actor, "Stardust", "Georgia on My Mind"
Angelin Chang, Grammy Award-winning classical pianist
John Clayton, jazz and classical bassist, composer and arranger
Jim Cornelison, tenor
Dorian, hip-hop recording artist and record producer
Peter Erskine, jazz drummer and educator
Miriam Fried, violinist and pedagogue, professor at New England Conservatory, winner of Queen Elisabeth Music Competition
Vivica Genaux, mezzo-soprano
Tom Gullion, jazz saxophonist
Jeff Hamilton, jazz drummer
Margaret Harshaw, mezzo-soprano and soprano at Metropolitan Opera
Booker T. Jones, songwriter, producer
Paul Katz, cellist, founding member of Cleveland Quartet, professor at New England Conservatory
Charles Kullman, tenor and chair of voice department at Metropolitan Opera
Frankie Masters, big band leader
Sylvia McNair, internationally acclaimed soprano
Edgar Meyer, Grammy Award-winning bassist, MacArthur Fellow, professor at Curtis Institute of Music
Hu Nai-yuan, violinist, winner of the Queen Elisabeth Music Competition
Shawn Pelton, session drummer
Larry Ridley, jazz bassist and music educator
Leonard Slatkin, composer and conductor, music director of Detroit Symphony Orchestra and BBC Symphony Orchestra
Straight No Chaser, a cappella group at IU 1996–1999; re-formed in 2008
Eileen Strempel, soprano and educator
Patrick Summers, conductor, artistic director Houston Grand Opera
Michael Weiss, jazz pianist, composer and educator
Pharez Whitted, jazz trumpet and composer
Pete Wilhoit, jazz and rock drummer and percussionist

Science and technology

Max Mapes Ellis, physiologist and explorer
Stephani Hatch, psychiatric epidemiologist at the Institute of Psychiatry, Psychology and Neuroscience
Jamie Hyneman, special effects expert; best known as co-host of the television series MythBusters
Scott A. Jones, inventor and serial entrepreneur, widely known for inventing voicemail systems
Kayla C. King, Professor of evolutionary ecology at University of Oxford, UK
Britt Koskella, evolutionary biologist professor at University of California, Berkeley
Samuel LaBudde, Goldman Award-winning environmentalist and biologist
Carl Otto Lampland, astronomer
Wardell Pomeroy, sexologist
Vesto Slipher, astronomer
John T. Thompson, military officer, supervised development of the M1903 Springfield rifle and the M1911 pistol, inventor of the Thompson submachine gun
Horace M. Trent, physicist best known for finding that a bull whip's crack is a sonic boom and for writing the currently accepted force-current analogy in physics known as the Trent analogy
Mansukh C. Wani, cancer researcher, discoverer of Taxol
James D. Watson, co-discoverer of the structure of DNA; author of The Double Helix; winner of the 1962 Nobel Prize in Physiology or Medicine
Silas Warner, game developer, creator of Wolfenstein

Sports

Other
Jan Crull Jr., documentary filmmaker and attorney; Ph.D. student in English Language and Literature in late 1970s; dropped out
Emily Harris, a founding member of Symbionese Liberation Army
Jim Jones, Peoples Temple founder, cult leader and mass murderer
Maxine Mesinger, gossip columnist
Norris W. Overton, U.S. Air Force Brigadier General
Jeff Sagarin, statistician and creator of various Sagarin Rating Systems
James Johnston Thornton, lawyer, Military Reconstruction Judge, land developer

Notable faculty

Former notable faculty

 David Aiken, opera singer; first baritone to appear on television with NBC's 1951 Hallmark Hall of Fame production of Amahl and the Night Visitors
 Yuri Bregel, a pioneer of Central Asian Historical Studies in the West
 Lynton K. Caldwell, principal architect of the 1969 National Environmental Policy Act
 Robert Daniel Carmichael, mathematician and discoverer of Carmichael numbers
Ralph Erskine Cleland, former President of the Botanical Society of America; cytogeneticist and botanist
 Richard Dorson, folklorist
 Frank K. Edmondson, astronomer
 Albert Elsen, art historian
 Carl H. Eigenmann, ichthyologist who described over 150 species of fish with wife Rosa Smith Eigenmann
 Eileen Farrell, famous opera and concert singer, later professor of music at IU
 J. Rufus Fears, David Ross Boyd Professor of Classics and G.T. and Libby Blankenship Chair in the History of Liberty, the University of Oklahoma
 Robert H. Ferrell, historian and author
 Paul Gebhard, anthropologist; part of Alfred Kinsey's original research team
 Josef Gingold, violin teacher and founder of the International Violin Competition of Indianapolis
Scott Russell Sanders, essayist
 Eliot S. Hearst, psychologist and professional chess player, Guggenheim Fellow
 Paul Hillier, choral conductor (most notably of Theatre of Voices)
 David Starr Jordan, ichthyologist, educator and peace activist, and founding President of Stanford University
 Alfred Kinsey, pioneer of the academic discipline of sexology in the United States, founder of the Kinsey Institute and the Kinsey Scale, author of the Kinsey Reports
 Daniel Kirkwood, astronomer famous for his work on asteroids, discoverer of Kirkwood gaps
 Bob Knight, head coach of the Indiana Hoosiers men's basketball 1971–2000
 Yusef Komunyakaa, Pulitzer Prize-winning poet
 John P. Lewis, economist, economic adviser appointed by John F. Kennedy
 Alfred R. Lindesmith, sociologist, author of The Addict and the Law
 Salvador Luria, pioneer of molecular biology, winner of the 1969 Nobel Prize in Physiology or Medicine
 Hermann Joseph Muller, geneticist, zoologist and winner of the 1946 Nobel Prize in Physiology or Medicine
 Thubten Jigme Norbu, Buddhist monk and professor of Central Eurasian Studies; elder brother of the Dalai Lama
 Elinor Ostrom, Arthur F. Bentley Professor of Political Science, co-recipient of the 2009 Nobel Memorial Prize in Economic Sciences
 Richard Owen, professor of natural sciences, second state geologist of Indiana, first president of Purdue University
 Vikram Pandit, CEO of Citigroup
 Edward Alsworth Ross, sociologist, educator, and President of the American Sociological Society who crusaded against unfair labor practices against Chinese immigrants and was indirectly responsible for the establishment of the tenure system
 Sven-David Sandström, composer
 Thomas A. Sebeok, semiotician
 Gyorgy Sebok, pianist
 Denis Sinor, historian, former professor of Cambridge University, Central Asia scholar 
 B.F. Skinner, psychologist, pioneer of operant conditioning model
 Raymond Smullyan, philosophy professor emeritus, logician, mathematician
 Elliot Sperling, scholar of Tibet
 János Starker, cellist
 Edwin Sutherland, one of the most influential criminologists of the 20th century
 James Alexander Thom, novelist, writer of historical fiction
 Stith Thompson, folklorist
 Michael Uslan, producer of the Batman movies
 Kenneth P. Williams, mathematician and historian, author of Lincoln Finds a General
 Iannis Xenakis, composer
 Jerry Yeagley, coach of the Indiana Hoosiers men's soccer team 1974–2003 with an NCAA record 544 wins
 Virginia Zeani, world-famous operatic soprano
 Max August Zorn, mathematician and originator of Zorn's lemma

Current notable faculty

David B. Allison, scientist, researcher
Martina Arroyo, operatic soprano
David Audretsch, economist
Edward Auer, pianist
Kathleen Bardovi-Harlig, applied linguist
Willis Barnstone, poet and translator
Marcia Baron, Rudy Professor of Philosophy
Abhijit Basu, geologist
Joshua Bell, Grammy Award-winning violinist
Katy Börner, engineer, specialist in data visualization
Hal E. Broxmeyer, biologist
J. Peter Burkholder, musicologist
Matei Călinescu, Romanian literary critic
James Campbell, clarinetist
Jamsheed Choksy, researcher on Middle Eastern religion and culture
Lynda Delph, biologist
Raymond J. DeMallie, anthropologist
Richard DiMarchi, Linda & Jack Gill Chair in Biomolecular Sciences
R. Kent Dybvig, computer scientist, creator of Chez Scheme
Eli Eban, clarinetist and professor of music
Michelle Facos, art historian
Daniel P. Friedman, computer scientist
Sumit Ganguly, political scientist, expert in South Asia
Henry Glassie, folklorist, author; former member of President's Council for the Humanities
Susan Gubar, literary scholar of feminist theory and literature
Douglas Hofstadter, Pulitzer prize winner; author of Gödel, Escher, Bach; IU professor of Cognitive Science
Larry Humes, audiologist
Dawn Johnsen, President Barack Obama's nominee for Assistant Attorney General for the Office of Legal Counsel
Jorge V. José, physicist
Lewis Kaplan, violinist, co-founder of the Bowdoin International Music Festival, professor at Juilliard School
Alan Kostelecky, physicist
Jaime Laredo, Grammy Award-winning violinist and conductor
J. Scott Long, statistician
Maurice Manning, poet
John Holmes McDowell, professor of folklore studies, Latin American studies scholar
Sylvia McNair, Grammy Award-winning soprano
James Naremore, film scholar
William R. Newman, historian
James L. Perry, Distinguished Professor of Public Affairs
Menahem Pressler, pianist of Beaux Arts Trio fame
Krishnan Raghavachari, chemist
Nazif Shahrani, anthropologist, professor of Central Eurasian Studies
Olaf Sporns, professor of cognitive science, psychology, and neuroscience, worked at the Neurosciences Institute
Giorgio Tozzi, operatic bass and actor
Carol Vaness, soprano
George M. von Furstenberg, economist
David Ward-Steinman, composer
André Watts, Grammy Award-winning classical pianist
Allen W. Wood, philosopher and scholar of Kant's moral philosophy
Vicky J. Meretsky, biologist, director of Environmental Master's Program

References

Indiana University